Housing in Hong Kong varies by location and income. More than 7 million people live on about 1,108 km2 (427 mi2) of land in the region, making it one of the densest places in the world.

History

Housing by types
In 2016 the total Hong Kong population was 7.3 million. According to the 2016 by-census, the population breakdown by type of housing was as follows:

Segmentation

Types

Housing estates
 Public housing estate
 Private housing estate

Traditional and historical housing
 Tong Lau
 Pang uk
 Walled villages of Hong Kong
 Kowloon Walled City

Sub-standard housing
 Subdivided flat
 Cage home

Policies

Land use 
According to the government's 2020 survey, of the 1,114 km2 (111,400 hectares) of land in Hong Kong, a total of 79 km2 (7,900 hectares) is allocated for residential purposes. Of that 79 km2, the breakdown is as follows:

Private residential (excludes village housing): 27 km2 (2,700 hectares), 34.2%
Public residential (includes subsidized housing and temporary housing area): 17 km2 (1,700 hectares), 21.5%
Village housing: 35 km2 (3,500 hectares), 44.3%

Though village housing occupies 44.3% of all residential land, only 7% of the population lives in it, with the other 93% of the population living in the other 55.7% of residential land. This means that non-village housing has, on average, about 10.6 times the population than village housing, for the same amount of land area.

Land selling

Public housing

Public housing is a major component of the housing in Hong Kong. About half of Hong Kong residents now live in public housing estates and other tower blocks with some form of subsidy. The history of public housing in Hong Kong can be traced back to the 1950s, where masses of people surged into Hong Kong due to political turmoil on the mainland. This led to a drastic increase in the number of squatters. Fires were common in these unhygienic and cramped makeshift homes. In 1953, a fire in Shek Kip Mei destroyed the shanty homes of approximately 53,000 people. In response the Hong Kong Government commenced a programme of mass public housing, providing affordable homes for low income citizens.

Several subsidized home ownership programs have been implemented, including: Home Ownership Scheme, Flat-for-Sale Scheme, Tenants Purchase Scheme, Sandwich Class Housing Scheme and Private Sector Participation Scheme.

Supply target 
The government sets a Long Term Housing Strategy every year, which plans housing units for the next 10 years. In 2014, the government's target for public and subsidized flats vs private housing units was set at 60% and 40%. In 2018, the target was changed to 70% public and 30% private. Under that ratio, the government projected 450,000 total flats to be developed in the 10 years after 2018, with 315,000 to be public, and 135,000 to be private.

SCMP noted that these were only targets, and that "Since 2014, the government has never hit its target of building enough public flats. The public housing units provided in the past four years only accounted for 47 per cent of the actual number of homes built, falling short of the 60 per cent target." Additionally, a member of the Democratic Party stated that without increasing land supply, the government would continue to fall short of its target.

In December 2020, Secretary for Transport and Housing Frank Chan announced that the next target would be 430,000 total units over the next 10 years, down from the 450,000 target specified in 2018. This means an annual target of 43,000 total units, with the same 70% public (30,100) and 30% private (12,900) target ratio. In December 2021, the target set in December 2020 was reconfirmed for the next 10 years.

In July 2021, Adam Kwok Kai-fai, an executive of Sun Hung Kai Properties, suggested that the 10 year targets did not have accountability, and that officials should set up a committee to oversee progress towards meeting the 10 year targets, with a government official held accountable if the targets were not met.

Expected shortage 
The Hong Kong government in 2016 estimated that over the next 30 years, Hong Kong will face a shortage of approximately 1,200 hectares for housing.

In 2021, the shortage was revised upwards to 3,000 hectares over the next 30 years.

Affordability 
Hong Kong's home prices top the list of least affordable markets among major world cities according to American research institution Demographia's latest report in January 2015. The Demographia International Housing Affordability Survey 2015 includes 378 property markets around the globe, generating Median Multiples according to the proportion of average property price to median household income. Results are categorized into 4 levels: Affordable (Below 3 times), Moderately Unaffordable (3.1 to 4 times), Seriously Unaffordable (4.1 to 5 times) and Severely Unaffordable (5.1 times and over). Hong Kong falls into the grading of ‘Severely Unaffordable’, with the highest recorded index of 17.0 since the report commenced 11 years ago. Second on the list was Vancouver with an index of 10.6, still significantly lower than HK.

A CBRE report from 2019 lists Hong Kong as having the highest average property price in the world. As of June 2021, an average 500 sqft apartment cost HK$9.44 million in Hong Kong Island, HK$8.32 million in Kowloon, and HK$7 million in New Territories; an average family would have to save for about 20.7 years to pay for such a unit.

According to the 2014/2015 Household Expenditure Survey, housing accounted for an average of 36% of average monthly household expenditure, with utilities accounting for an additional 3%.

The home ownership rate peaked at 54.3% in 2004. The median floor area of households as of 2016 is 430 sqft, while the floor area per capita is 160 sqft.

Proposed causes of high housing cost

There are many contributing factors to Hong Kong's extremely high cost of housing. Though Hong Kong's economy is historically based on positive non-interventionism, the government intervenes heavily in housing, disrupting free-market economics. The high costs of housing have caused some to live in very small subdivided flats, sometimes referred to as "coffin homes", with an estimated 110,000 subdivided units in Hong Kong, housing 220,000 people. Those living in poor conditions (subdivided flats, rooftop huts, industrial or commercial buildings, cubicles, and bed spaces) are estimated to house 127,000 households over the next 10 years.

Several reasons for the high costs and lack of free-market economics of the housing market have been outlined by the media, and are explained below:

Supply constraint

Small House Policy 
The Small House Policy, introduced in 1972, guarantees male indigenous villagers a grant to build his own house. It has been described as an unsustainable policy due to shortage of land; as noted by a professor at Chinese University, "The problem that has to be faced is that of sustainability. Sooner or later, there will not be enough land to satisfy a potentially endless pool of claimants." In addition, the former Secretary for Housing, Planning and Lands, Michael Suen Ming-yeung, has also said that the policy is unsustainable, and that "They will keep producing new generations; the policy cannot be allowed to continue. People have to agree on a date that the small house right should end, in ten or 20 years - to allow enough time for preparation so that the benefits of current right holders are not hurt." Though Carrie Lam has called for an end to the policy, the Heung Yee Kuk, which represents villagers, has spent resources to challenge changes to the policy. According to a SCMP report, 5,000 hectares, representing about 20% of all urban space in Hong Kong, is locked up for these low-rise developments, rather than being used for high-rise developments which would increase the supply of housing.

Also, according to the Heung Yee Kuk, there are approximately 2,400 hectares of tso/tong land, land which is held in the name of villager clans and families, many of which are underutilized. In May 2021, SCMP noted how difficult it is for tso/tong land to be sold by villagers and bought by developers, as it requires unanimous consent of a villager clan/family, rather than a majority.

In May 2021, Liber Research Community released another report titled Research Report on Development Potential of Vacant Small House Land, which determined that of a total of 3,380 hectares of village-type land, 1,548.8 hectares were idle and privately owned, with a separate 932.9 hectares of idle land belonging to the government, totaling 2,481.7 hectares. Additionally, it found potential collusion between developers and villagers on 149.1 hectares of idle privately owned villager land.

Chinese military land usage 
The Hong Kong Garrison of the People's Liberation Army, the military force of China, occupies 2,750 hectares of land across Hong Kong, land that has been reported to be underutilized and could be used for housing instead. In particular, the Castle Peak / Tsing Shan firing range occupies 2,263 hectares, or around 80% of all PLA land area.

Brownfield sites 
Predominantly in the New Territories, the Legislative Council found that active brownfield sites occupy 1,414 hectares of land, with inactive brownfield sites occupying an additional 165 hectares. A government-appointed task force surveyed the public and found that developing brownfield sites was one of the most favored options for developing new housing. The Liber Research Community estimated that almost 90% of businesses that use brownfield sites could be easily relocated to multi-story buildings, freeing up land for housing.

In June 2021, Liber Research Community and Greenpeace East Asia collaborated and found a new total of 1,950 hectares of brownfield sites, 379 more hectares than the government was previously able to locate. In September 2021, Greenpeace East Asia found several brownfield sites that illegally stored hazardous materials.

In October 2022, the government said it had identified 1,600 hectares of brownfield sites, still lower than the 1,950 found earlier.

Rural Land Hoarding 
Large developers own large amounts of rural land in Hong Kong, land which could be used for housing. Developers have been estimated to hold at least 1,000 hectares of agricultural land just in the New Territories, equivalent to at least 107 million square feet. In 2019, the government announced that it would seize a total of 7.3 million square feet of land (67.8 hectares), including 1 million square feet (9.3 hectares) of underutilized land from Henderson Land Development. SCMP found that large developers hold vast amounts of rural land in their land banks, with Henderson owning 44.9 million square feet (417 hectares) of rural land at the end of 2019.

In July 2021, Liber Research Community found that developers had begun to hoard land alongside the proposed Northern Link metro line, buying at least 80 hectares of land near the line.

Private Recreational Leases 
Land is also used by private sports clubs, organizations which only pay a minimal amount of money for the government-subsidized land they occupy under "private recreational leases." 27 private recreational leases are used by 24 private sports clubs occupying a total of 828 acres (335 hectares). This includes the Hong Kong Golf Club in Fanling, occupying a  site which the Planning Department estimated could be developed into 13,200 homes, enough to house 37,000 people. The Hong Kong Golf Club paid a total HK$2,500,000 in 2017 for rent to the government, only 3% of actual market value, meaning the other 97% is subsidized by the government. The Golf Club charges individuals a full membership fee HK$17,000,000 which means a single person's full membership fee covers almost 7 years of rent for the entire club. In August 2022, a government official, Regina Ip, said that the golf course should not be used for housing. In another example, the Hong Kong Gun Club pays a total HK$1,000 a year to the government despite operating on a  site and charging individuals a lifetime membership fee of HK$300,000.

In addition to the 27 private sports club sites that occupy 335 hectares, an additional 39 sites used by "community organizations" (such as the Hong Kong Jockey Club) occupy another 67 hectares, giving Private Recreational Leases a total usage of around 400 hectares.

Demand unmatched

Immigration from Mainland China 
The One-way Permit allows up to 150 mainlanders a day to permanently move to Hong Kong, a policy that increases demand and pricing for housing. In a 2019 research study named "A Tale of Two Cities: The Impact of Cross-Border Migration on Hong Kong's Housing Market," the empirical research determined that 3.67% of all purchases were made by those from mainland China. The study notes that "We provide additional evidence that mainland Chinese buyers create an upward price momentum in Hong Kong’s housing market. Although their percentage is only 3.7% of the entire buyer population, the momentum they create can be quite influential and drive up the market."

Additionally, approximately 20% out of all family applicants of Public Rental Housing were found to be those who came on One-way permits.

In 2011, mainland Chinese accounted for 11% of all home sales, and 30.2% of new home sales. In 2019, 8.4% of all home sales were by mainland Chinese.

Money laundering 
As Mainland China have strict control on flow of capitals, it have become difficult for wealthy people in Mainland China to move their asset overseas. However, underground money transfer market have made it easy for these people to avoid relevant restrictions and transfer millions or billions of dollar into Hong Kong. Under the arrangement of one country, two systems, Hong Kong have become a convenient spot for wealthy people in Mainland China to transfer money out of Mainland China government's capital control. Many of the money have gone into housing market of Hong Kong in the process, resulting in spike in property price.

Foreign investment

Desire to keep housing price high

Hong Kong government 

The government collects a significant portion of its revenue from housing, specifically from stamp duty collection and land premium. As stamp duty is based on transaction price, higher transaction prices generate more income for the government, giving the government a conflict of interest when seeking to reduce the price of housing. CNBC has reported on the conflict of interest, saying "If property values drop, the government can’t generate as much revenue, meaning there’s little incentive to seriously curb Hong Kong's cost of housing." As noted in the Routledge Handbook of Contemporary Hong Kong, "The enormous land sales income is made possible because of the existence of a highly lucrative property market, which is itself the result of the government's 'high premiums, low rents' policy."

According to the Legislative Council, in recent years, housing-related revenue has accounted for anywhere between 27.4% - 42.0% of total government revenue.

All revenue collected through land premium is used for the Capital Works Reserve Fund (CWRF), which by law, can only be spent on infrastructure and land production, rather than going to social services, unless specifically requested by the government. According to Liber Research Community, this system is an "infrastructure-land capital revolving door", where high land premiums pay for new land production, which is then sold at high premiums to continue the cycle.

According to a former deputy director of lands, lease modifications, where premium is required to be paid in order to change lease terms (such as converting an industrial plot to residential) is fundamentally flawed.

When a plot of land is put up for auction by the government, "The government will not sell a site if no bid reaches the reserve price as assessed by the government’s professional valuers," restricting the amount of land available for usage and setting a minimum floor on land prices. The reserve price is also kept secret. Since 2019, at least 8 plots of land have been withdrawn from public sale. In February 2023, a plot of land in Oyster Bay was withdrawn by the MTR Corporation after it received 3 bids.

In March 2023, Financial Secretary Paul Chan said that "We can say that the government does not have a high land price policy, which had drawn criticism in the past. But we won't sell land at dirt cheap prices either."

Chinese Communist Party officials 
Around the time of handover of Hong Kong in 1997, relatives of Chinese Communist Party officials have started to invest money into Hong Kong en masse. Investigations by the New York Times have found at least three of the top four leadership of the Chinese Communist Party buying properties worth over US$51 million in Hong Kong. For example, Li Zhanshu, the third-highest ranked member of the Chinese Communist Party had his daughter purchase a beachside townhouse worth over US$15 million. Such sort of investments have been seen as incentive for party officials to keep the property price in Hong Kong high, with for example Li Zhanshu leading the passage of the Hong Kong National Security Law which suppressed opposition whose activities might affect the value of housing in Hong Kong. Other top-ranked communist party officials like Xi Jinping and Wang Yang have also been discovered to have relatives making similar investments into Hong Kong. Those relatives of Chinese Communist Party officials, also known as Princelings, have formed connections with elites in Hong Kong.

Property owners 
After Asian financial crisis in the end of 1990s, Hong Kong's housing price dropped almost half from the peak. It have caused the net worth of many citizens to dropped significantly, and resulted in many cases of negative equity due to mortgage loan among citizens who have purchased residential units during the previous bubble era, resulting in social problem. At the time, the Hong Kong government have enacted policies accordingly to prevent the property price from further dropping by tightening supply and stimulating demand, in order to change the direction of housing price trend in Hong Kong. Many of those policies have since been cancelled, but their effect, as well as the cause behind these policies, are still affecting the city's housing market till modern time.

In 2023, property owners in Kai Tak opposed a plan by the government to build temporary, "light public housing" in the neighborhood, which SCMP writer Alice Wu said was a case of "not in my backyard," or NIMBYism. Lawmaker Kitson Yang represented the residents and cast the only abstained vote on the plan to build it.

Developers 
In October 2022, Stewart Leung, executive committee chairman of the Real Estate Developers Association (REDA), which represents the city's biggest developers, argued that prices should not drop, saying "Even if home prices do not rise, do not let them fall."

In January 2023, Leung from REDA said that developers would "make a lot of noise" if the government decided to repurpose a community isolation facility into public housing in Kai Tak, and said "Repurposing that facility will ruin the entire Kai Tak area."

Effects of high housing cost 
Due to the high costs of housing, some people in Hong Kong have found both legal and illegal means to minimize costs or increase the size of their property.

Small unit size 
The government can therefore claim that more units are being constructed on an annual basis, without disclosing what percentage of the units are nano flats, and without disclosing total floor area being created. One estimate projected that 20% of 18,000 new private flats created in the next 5 years would be smaller than 215 square feet.

Evasion of Stamp Duty 
Newman Investment, a subsidiary of the Liaison Office, has been purchasing property without paying stamp duty, even though Newman is a registered private company. It has been found to have been exempted from several hundred million HKD in stamp duty in the past few years, meaning the government has subsidized purchases for Newman, and that even Beijing's Liaison Office does not want to pay the normal costs of stamp duty.

Stamp duty can be evaded or minimized in other ways, including methods used by Secretary of Justice Teresa Cheng and her husband, Otto Poon Lok-to. Even though Cheng already owned other properties, one of her later purchases was entitled to the "first-time buyer" stamp duty as her earlier purchases were registered to companies she owns and not her directly, saving her HK $6.7 million in stamp duty. Her husband, Otto Poon Lok-to, used another method to escape HK $10 million in stamp duty by purchasing a company that owned a flat at 1 Robinson Road, giving him ownership of the flat (via ownership of the company) without paying any stamp duty. A report by Liber Research Community found that between 2010 and 2018, a total of HK $9.4 billion of stamp duty was evaded by using company share transfers.

Illegal structures 
Approximately 25% of all residential property in Hong Kong has been illegally modified to add extra space or other features. Even several high-profile government officials have been caught with illegal structures in their properties, including Secretary of Justice Teresa Cheng, former Chief Secretary Henry Tang Ying-yen, and former Chief Executives Donald Tsang and CY Leung.

In August 2022, news reported that Secretary for Housing Winnie Ho had illegal structures for 14 years after the government had asked her to take it down.

In February 2023, the Ombudsman said that in village houses, 1/3rd of all government orders to remove unauthorized structures were ignored; there were  5,384 removal orders among the village houses by the end of 2021.

Social instability 
Media like New York Times and BBC have linked housing situation in Hong Kong to the series of protests in the territory in 2010s.

Such explanation have been used by Beijing-owned news agencies and newspapers in September 2019 to attribute the housing situation as the "root cause" of the 2019–20 Hong Kong protests to dismiss other discussed causes of the protests which includes against increased control from China and strive for democracy. Those media criticize property developers in Hong Kong as being responsible for housing shortage and high housing price that resulted in social instability and protests, after one of the property developer, Li Ka-shing, issued a statement about the protest against the party line. These Mainland China Government controlled media have also criticized developers for hoarding land, and not developing sites to meet the housing shortage, as part of their attempt to attribute the blames.

Public housing deception 
Public housing requires income and assets to be below a certain threshold; some people in public housing have been caught lying about their income and assets above those thresholds, defrauding citizens who are on the waiting list for public housing.

Approximately 1.6% of owners have been found to buy and resell their Home Ownership Scheme flats within 3-5 years after purchasing them at a subsidized rate, profiting on average by 102%.

In 2021, approximately 1,300 public housing units were taken back by the government from public housing residents due to tenancy abuse and tenancy agreement violations, including subletting to other people, non-domestic usage, or declaring their assets lower than their true value.

In November 2022, the government said that 26 households from public housing were found making false declarations about their income and other assets.

In February 2023, SCMP reported that Kwong Kau, the ex father-in-law of Abby Choi, bought a subsidized Home Ownership Scheme apartment, despite being the owner of a separate HK$73 million apartment. The Permanent Secretary for Housing, Agnes Wong, confirmed that the government does not verify the assets of Green Form Subsidised Home Ownership Scheme applicants. Wong also said both income and assets of Green Form applicants have not been verified since the Scheme was started in the 1970s.

In March 2023, Winnie Ho said that about 690 households per year are found to exceed the maximum allowed income or assets for the subsidized housing.

Proposals to address high housing cost 

Due to recurring issues with housing unaffordability, the government commissioned the Task Force on Land Supply in 2017, which in 2019, presented a report to the Legislative Council with suggestions on increasing the supply of housing. The government's response was that Chief Executive ordered that all recommendations by the Task Force be accepted.

Vacancy tax 
Carrie Lam proposed a vacancy tax in June 2018 for new units which were still unsold 12 months after being issued an occupation permit, a tax which would punish developers who leave new units unsold for a long time. The bill was later shelved; in response, a member of the Liber Research Community said that the government had sacrificed citizens and protected developers by shelving the bill. According to the Legislative Council, unsold units amounted to 12,300 total units at the end of 2020.

The general vacancy rate, including both old and new units, but excluding village housing, has been at around 4% of all units over the past decade. In 2020, the general vacancy rate was 4.3%, meaning 52,366 units were empty.

In January 2023, Paul Chan said that the government had decided against implementing a vacancy tax.

Mainland China government 
In July 2021, Xia Baolong, director of China's Hong Kong and Macau Affairs Office at the time, stated that before 2049, "We expect Hong Kong society to be more harmonious and peaceful, and the housing problems that we are all concerned about will have been greatly improved. We will bid farewell to subdivided flats and ‘cage homes'".

In July 2022, General Secretary of the Chinese Communist Party Xi Jinping said that "Currently, the biggest aspiration of Hong Kong people is to lead a better life, in which they will have more decent housing." Xi also said that the government should "break the barriers of vested interests."

In March 2023, Wang Huning told Hong Kong delegates to the NPC that they should tackle housing issues as a priority.

See also

 List of most expensive houses in Hong Kong
 List of tallest buildings in Hong Kong
 Architecture of Hong Kong
 Bedspace apartment
 Subdivided flat
 Demographics of Hong Kong
 Economy of Hong Kong
 Asian property market
 Land and the Ruling Class in Hong Kong, a book related to the housing of the city

References

 Hongkong Post Circular Service - Neighborhood Type
 On the margins of a booming city: housing for the poor in Hong Kong
 Housing in Figures by HKHA

External links